Beautiful Billo is a Punjabi film starring Neeru Bajwa, Rubina Bajwa, Roshan Prince, Rup Khatkar, and Raghveer Boli. The film was directed by Santosh Subhash Thite and Amrit Raj Chadha. It released on ZEE5 on 11 August 2022.

Plot 
The story is based in UK. It's about a pregnant lady Billo who has secretly moved to stay at recently-married Navi's empty house. The chaos starts when Navi's wife Sonika finds out about Billo staying in their house and navi lies to her to save his marriage. What follows is a lot of drama and a lot of confusion regarding who actually is Billo's husband as everyone thinks someone else is Billo's husband.

Cast 
Neeru Bajwa as Billo
Roshan Prince as Navi
Rubina Bajwa as Sonika
Sukhi Chahal as Balbir
Baninder Bunny as Bajirao Birmingham
Rupinder Rupi
Jatinder Kaur
Raghveer Boli
Honey Mattu

References

External links 
 Beautiful Billo on ZEE5
 

2022 films
Indian drama films
Punjabi-language Indian films